Côtière or Côtière de l'Ain is a natural region located southwest of the department of Ain, France. It is along a slope of about forty kilometers, beginning with the balcony of Croix-Rousse and ending in Meximieux.

The main cities are Miribel, Montluel and Meximieux. Pérouges is member of Les Plus Beaux Villages de France.

Bibliography

See also 
 Bugey-Côtière (Newspaper)

References 

Geography of Ain
Hauts-de-France region articles needing translation from French Wikipedia